Kepler-186 is a main-sequence M1-type dwarf star, located 178.5 parsecs (582 light years) away in the constellation of Cygnus. The star is slightly cooler than the sun, with roughly half its metallicity. It is known to have five planets, including the first Earth-sized world discovered in the habitable zone: Kepler-186f. The star hosts four other planets discovered so far, though they all orbit interior to the habitable zone.

Star
A number of previously unknown measurements of the star are known. In the infrared/microwave EM spectrum its H band magnitude is 11.605, J band magnitude is 12.473, and its K band magnitude is 11.605. In the visual Photometric system magnitude it is 14.90(R)(towards the red end of the visual spectrum) and 16.40(B)(the blue end of the spectrum) (see also Apparent magnitude.) It is a BY Draconis variable changing brightness slightly, probably from star-spots, with a period of 33.695 days.

Discovery of a planetary system
Within two first years of gathered data, the signals of four inner planetary candidates were found. Discussion of planets in the system was taking place in August and November 2013. In February 2014, those planets were confirmed through the "verification by multiplicity" method. The fifth outermost candidate was confirmed in the same manner in April 2014. The possibility that the signals in the light curve of the star were actually from something else has been ruled out by an investigation with the W. M. Keck and Gemini Observatories, using speckle imaging and adaptive optics techniques, which, while unable to resolve the planets, were able to rule out other possibilities than the system of planets.

Planetary system

The five planets discovered around Kepler-186 are all expected to have a solid surface. The smallest one, Kepler-186b, is only 8% larger than Earth, while the largest one, Kepler-186d, is almost 40% larger.

The four innermost planets are probably tidally locked, but Kepler-186f is farther out, where the star's tidal effects are much weaker, so there may not have been enough time for its spin to slow down that much. Because of the very slow evolution of red dwarf stars, the age of the Kepler-186 system is poorly constrained, although it is likely to be greater than a few billion years. There is a roughly 50-50 chance it is tidally locked. Since it is closer to its star than Earth is to the Sun, it will probably rotate much more slowly than Earth; its day could be weeks or months long (see Tidal effects on rotation rate, axial tilt and orbit).

Planetary formation simulations have also shown that there could be one additional non-transiting low-mass planet between Kepler-186e and Kepler-186f. If this planet exists, it is likely not much more massive than Earth. If it were, its gravitational influence would likely prevent Kepler-186f from transiting. Conjectures involving the Titius–Bode law, (and the related Dermott's law) indicate that there could be several remaining planets to be found in the system - two small ones between e and f and another larger one outside of f. That hypothetical outer planet must have an orbital radius beyond 16.4 AU for planetary system to remain stable.

The low metallicity of the star at a metallicity (dex) of -0.26, or to put it another way, about half that of the Sun's, is associated with a decreased chance of planets overall and giant planets specifically but an increased chance of Earth sized planets, in a general study of stars.

Naming

Kepler project
As the Kepler telescope observational campaign progressed initial identifications of systems were entered in the Kepler Input Catalog (KIC), and then progressed as a candidate host of planets as Kepler Object of Interest (KOI). Thus Kepler 186 started as KIC 8120608 and then was identified as KOI 571.

Outside the Kepler project
Outside of the Kepler project, the 2MASS survey catalogued this star as 2MASS J19543665+4357180.

See also

Kepler-62
Gliese 667
TRAPPIST-1
Proxima Centauri b
K-type main-sequence star
Red dwarf
Kepler 442
Barnard's Star

References

External links 
First Potentially Habitable Terran World, PHL
NASA's Kepler Discovers First Earth-Size Planet In The 'Habitable Zone' of Another Star, NASA, April 17, 2014
Kepler-186 at The NASA Exoplanet Archive

 
571
M-type main-sequence stars
Cygnus (constellation)
Planetary systems with five confirmed planets
J19543665+4357180
Planetary transit variables
TIC objects